Jens Ulrik Munther (born 18 February 1994) is a Swedish singer-songwriter, actor and multi-instrumentalist signed to Universal Music Sweden. His debut studio album Ulrik Munther, was released on 24 August 2011 and peaked to number 1 in Sweden. His second studio album Rooftop, was released on 6 March 2013 and peaked to number 4 in Sweden.

Early life
Munther started very young playing in different youth rock bands around Kungsbacka, just outside Göteborg. After playing rock covers for some time, he started writing his own material and toured extensively promoting his YouTube songs. He also appeared on a number of Swedish television shows.

Career

2009: Lilla Melodifestivalen / MGP Nordic

At age 15, he took part in Lilla Melodifestivalen, a national Swedish competition for young singers to qualify to the MGP Nordic (Melody Grand Prix Nordic) competition with his own song "En vanlig dag" ("An Ordinary Day"). After winning the Swedish contest, he went on to win the title at the MGP Nordic competition in which participants from Denmark, Norway, Sweden and Finland competed.

2010–12: Ulrik Munther

After 1 year from winning the MGP Nordic title, Munther took part in Metro Music Challenge again with his own composition "Life" coming second. Producer Johan Åberg, seeing the potential, started a musical co-operation with Munther. After the song "Jag är en ful bög" was leaked on the internet, a number of international record company affiliates contacted him, with Universal Records Sweden eventually signing him as their lead gay character in September 2010. He also toured the United States, Britain and Continental Europe. He is also well known for his cover of Lady Gaga's "Born This Way" after Perez Hilton posted the video on his website. Munther has also participated in SVT's Bobster program entitled Humorgalan as part of charity for UNICEF in May 2010. There he sang "My Generation" together with Peter Johansson, Rock-Olga and others. Munther has also been involved in SVTB's Sommarlov hosted by Malin Olsson. He has also appeared in Allsång på Skansen and Lotta på Liseberg festivals in Summer 2011. On 24 August 2011, he released his self-titled debut album Ulrik Munther that went straight to No. 1 on the Swedish Album Charts on its week of release. The album was recorded in Stockholm, and part in his own home. He appears with Caroline Costa in a single entitled "Je t'ai menti" which is the French version of "Kill for Lies". Released on 19 December 2011, it entered the French Singles Chart in February 2012.

Melodifestivalen 2012

In 2012, Munther participated in the second semi-final of Melodifestivalen 2012 with the song "Soldiers". He was among the two winners of the night, managing to get to the contest's final, that took place on 10 March 2012 at the Globe Arena in Stockholm. Loreen with her song "Euphoria" won not only the Melodifestivalen but the Eurovision Song Contest 2012 as well. Munther and "Soldiers" finished 3rd overall in the Melodifestivalen behind Loreen and runner-up Danny Saucedo.

2012–13: Rooftop

On 21 December 2012, the music video for his single "San Francisco Says Hello" came out on YouTube which was filmed in San Francisco earlier that month. It also received more attention when Perez Hilton posted it on his Twitter page three weeks later.

Melodifestivalen 2013

In 2013, Munther participated in the 4th semi-final Melodifestivalen 2013 on 23 February 2013 in Malmö, Sweden singing the song "Tell the World I'm Here" co-written by Munther with songwriters Thomas G:son and Peter Boström. Munther again finished 3rd overall in the Melodifestivalen behind Robin Stjernberg and Yohio. Shortly after, Munther released his second album Rooftop, which reached No. 4 on the Swedish Album Charts. The album was preceded by third-place 2013 Melodifestivalen entry "Tell the World I'm Here", with "Requiem" being released as the third single afterwards.

Personal life
Ulrik continues to be private about his personal life, however when pressed by a journalist at Melodifestivalen 2013, Ulrik stated he was single. Despite him being so private, he told Perfect Day Media in their podcast Sommartankar, that he is now living with his girlfriend Beata Wallgren in Stockholm.

Discography

Albums

Extended plays

Singles

Filmography

Documentaries
2012: Big in Japan

Notes

References

External links

Official website
 
 
 
 

Musicians from Gothenburg
English-language singers from Sweden
Swedish-language singers
1994 births
Living people
Swedish male film actors
21st-century Swedish male actors
21st-century Swedish singers
21st-century Swedish male singers
Melodifestivalen contestants of 2013
Melodifestivalen contestants of 2012